Rhagium syriacum is a species of beetle in the family Cerambycidae. It was described by Pic in 1892.

References

Lepturinae
Beetles described in 1892